Şərurspor PFK is an Azerbaijani football club. The club currently takes part in Azerbaijan First Division.

Current squad 
''

History
The club was founded in 2015 and made its debut in Azerbaijan First Division with a 1-2 defeat at FC Baku. The colours of the club are green and white.

Football clubs in Azerbaijan
1955 establishments in Azerbaijan